El Norte ("The North") may refer to:

 El Norte (film), 1983, directed by Gregory Nava
 El Norte (Monterrey), a Mexican daily newspaper, published in the state of Nuevo Léon
 El Norte, a gang in the television series Oz
 El Norte, an album by the Gotan Project
 El Norte (Region), an administrative district of the Spanish Empire created in 1776. Present-day northern Mexico and the Southwestern United States.